Our Hunting Fathers, Op. 8, is an orchestral song-cycle by Benjamin Britten, first performed in 1936. Its text, assembled and partly written by W. H. Auden, with a pacifist slant, puzzled audiences at the premiere, and the work has never achieved the popularity of the composer's later orchestral song-cycles, Les Illuminations, the Serenade for Tenor, Horn and Strings and the Nocturne.

Background
In the mid-1930s Britten was employed by the GPO Film Unit, composing music for documentary films. Also working for the unit was the poet and critic W. H. Auden, with whom Britten collaborated on the films Coal Face (1935) and Night Mail (1936). Auden was something of a mentor to the young Britten, encouraging him to widen his aesthetic, intellectual and political horizons.

Britten received a commission to compose a work involving orchestra for the 1936 Norfolk and Norwich Triennial Music Festival. Auden assembled the text for an orchestral song cycle, writing some of it and adapting other sections from existing poems. The work, described as a "symphonic cycle for high voice and orchestra", was composed between May and July 1936 and titled Our Hunting Fathers.

On 19 September 1936, less than a week before the premiere, Britten rehearsed the work with the soprano Sophie Wyss and the London Philharmonic Orchestra in the loft at Covent Garden. Britten afterwards described the rehearsal as "the most catastrophic evening of my life" which left him "feeling pretty suicidal". According to Sophie Wyss, the "members of the orchestra were not used to that kind of music and played about disgracefully. When the reference to rats came in the score they ran around pretending they were chasing rats on the floor!" Ralph Vaughan Williams, who was present, reproved the orchestra, with the result, Wyss recalls, that the players "pulled themselves together" in time for the next rehearsal held in Norwich on 21 September.

Premiere and reception
The premiere was given at the 34th Norfolk and Norwich Triennial Musical Festival on 25 September 1936, conducted by the composer. The performance went without mishap, leaving "most of the audience", according to Britten, "very interested if bewildered". The press reviews ranged "from flattering & slightly bewildered (D. Tel.) - to reprehension & disapproving (Times)".

Richard Capell in The Daily Telegraph wrote:

The reviewer in The Observer, comparing the piece unfavourably with Vaughan Williams's Five Tudor Portraits which had been premiered at the festival that same day, wrote:

The Times was less severe, but its critic made his dislike of the piece discreetly clear.

Although Britten's music had, as a biographer put it, "bizarre new sounds" calculated to discomfit an audience, most of the opprobrium seems to have been directed at Auden's text. Ostensibly about man's relationship with animals it is a not very deeply disguised tract about man's relationship with man, from a left-wing, pacifist viewpoint.

In April 1937 the BBC broadcast a performance of the work with Wyss and the BBC Symphony Orchestra conducted by Sir Adrian Boult; the cycle was not performed again until 1950. The analyst Lloyd Moore commented in 2004 that even latterly the work is seldom heard in the concert-hall and "must qualify as one of the most neglected of Britten's major works".

Structure
The work lasts about half an hour in performance. It is in five sections:
Prologue – words by Auden
Rats Away! – anonymous, updated by Auden
Messalina – anonymous
Hawking for the Partridge (Dance of Death) – words by Thomas Ravenscroft
Epilogue – words by Auden.

The Prologue is in a form akin to recitative and introduces the cycle's musical motto, described by Moore as "a descending major triad climbing back to the minor third". "Rats Away!" is an agitated, shrill section, demanding vocal  virtuosity from the soloist, who is gradually overwhelmed by the orchestra, its music suggesting the scurrying of rats.

The third section, "Messalina", is a lyrical elegy for a dead monkey, with a succession of solos for flute, oboe, clarinet and saxophone. The fourth section, "Hawking for the Partridge" (subtitled Dance of Death) follows without a break, the soloist reciting the names of the dogs joining in the hunt. In Moore's words, "The catch itself is marked by a fortissimo unison on the muted brass, after which the soprano isolates the two names 'German, Jew', signifying unambiguously who is the hunter and who the hunted."

The work ends with an Epilogue and Funeral March,  disrupted by a repetitive motif on the xylophone, bringing the cycle to an equivocal and ambiguous conclusion.

Recordings
The cycle has been recorded with soprano soloists, and also with tenors, as authorised by the score.

Ian Bostridge, Britten Sinfonia, Daniel Harding (EMI Classics) OCLC 43271701
Phyllis Bryn-Julson, English Chamber Orchestra, Steuart Bedford (Naxos),
Heather Harper, London Philharmonic Orchestra, Bernard Haitink (LPO)
Peter Pears, London Symphony Orchestra, Benjamin Britten (BBC) OCLC 44873944
Elisabeth Söderström, Orchestra of Welsh National Opera, Richard Armstrong (EMI Classics) OCLC 32488462

Notes

References
 
 

1936 compositions
Song cycles by Benjamin Britten
Poetry by W. H. Auden
Classical song cycles in English